Carpathonesticus is a genus of spiders in the family Nesticidae. It was first described in 1980 by Lehtinen & Saaristo. , it contains 21 species.

Species
Carpathonesticus comprises the following species:
Carpathonesticus avrigensis Weiss & Heimer, 1982 — Romania
 Carpathonesticus biroi (Kulczyński, 1895) — Romania
 Carpathonesticus birsteini (Charitonov, 1947) — Russia, Georgia
 Carpathonesticus borutzkyi (Reimoser, 1930) — Turkey, Georgia, Ukraine
 Carpathonesticus caucasicus (Charitonov, 1947) — Georgia
 Carpathonesticus cibiniensis (Weiss, 1981) — Romania
 Carpathonesticus eriashvilii Marusik, 1987 — Georgia
 Carpathonesticus fodinarum (Kulczyński, 1894) — Romania
 Carpathonesticus galotshkae Evtushenko, 1993 — Ukraine
 Carpathonesticus hungaricus (Chyzer, 1894) — Romania
 Carpathonesticus ljovuschkini (Pichka, 1965) — Russia
 Carpathonesticus lotriensis Weiss, 1983 — Romania
 Carpathonesticus mamajevae Marusik, 1987 — Georgia
 Carpathonesticus orolesi Nae, 2013 — Romania
 Carpathonesticus paraavrigensis Weiss & Heimer, 1982 — Romania
 Carpathonesticus parvus (Kulczyński, 1914) — Bosnia-Hercegovina
 Carpathonesticus puteorum (Kulczyński, 1894) — Romania
 Carpathonesticus racovitzai (Dumitrescu, 1980) — Romania
 Carpathonesticus simoni (Fage, 1931) — Romania
 Carpathonesticus spelaeus (Szombathy, 1917) — Romania
 Carpathonesticus zaitzevi (Charitonov, 1939) — Georgia

Former species
The following species were transferred from Carpathonesticus to other genera:
 Carpathonesticus menozzii (Caporiacco, 1934) — Italy (now Domitius menozzii)
 Carpathonesticus ponticus (Spassky, 1932) (now Aituaria pontica)

References

Nesticidae
Araneomorphae genera
Taxa named by Pekka T. Lehtinen